The 2010 Uzbekistan Cup Final was the final match of the 2010 Uzbekistan Cup, the 18th season of the Uzbek Cup, a football competition for the 36 teams in the Uzbek League and Uzbek League Division One. The match was contested by FC Bunyodkor and FC Shurtan Guzar, at Pakhtakor Markaziy Stadium in Tashkent, on August 18, 2010.

Road to the final

Match

References

Cup
Uzbekistan Cup
2010